10th Tactical Squadron (known as 10.ELT - 10 Eskadra Lotnictwa Taktycznego in Poland) is a fighter squadron of Polish Air Force established in 2008 in Łask, Poland. The squadron is stationed at 32nd Air Base and since 1 October 2008 operates the F-16 C/D Block 52+ Adv.

In March 2012 the squadron deployed to Israeli Air Force base Ovda for a two-week-long joint exercise with Israel's 115, 117 and 106 squadrons.

References 

Squadrons of the Polish Air Force